Coast Stars is a Kenyan football club based in Mombasa. The club was founded in 1998. They are a member of the top division in Kenyan football. Their home stadium is Mombasa Municipal Stadium. They played the 2004/05 season under the name Dubai Bank Limited Club after their sponsors Dubai Bank. The original name was reverted to in the next season. One of the players that has moved to Europe from Coast Stars is Emmanuel Ake.

Performance in CAF competitions
CAF Cup Winners' Cup: 1 appearance
2000 – First Round

Football clubs in Kenya
Association football clubs established in 1998
Sport in Mombasa
1998 establishments in Kenya